Precious Mudyiwa (born 2 February 1998) is a Zimbabwean footballer who plays as a goalkeeper for Black Rhinos Queens FC and the Zimbabwe women's national team.

Club career
Mudyiwa played for Zimbabwean club Black Rhinos Queens at the 2021 CAF Women's Champions League COSAFA Qualifiers.

International career
Mudyiwa capped for Zimbabwe at senior level during the 2021 COSAFA Women's Championship.

References

1998 births
Living people
Zimbabwean women's footballers
Women's association football goalkeepers
Zimbabwe women's international footballers